Rimosodaphnella is a genus of sea snails, marine gastropod mollusks in the family Raphitomidae.

Description
(Original description) The diagnosis that Cossmann previously provided in support of Bellardiella does not apply - as we have seen above - to the genotype which is a typical Clathurella. It remains to name the shells which, like Pl. textilis, are not true Daphnella, because of their more twisted and shorter siphonal canal, their more elongated spire, and their narrower aperture in front. This group absolutely deviates from Clathurella because of its thin outer lip, its very deep sinus, its unpleated columella, so that there is only a distant analogy in ornamentation. Cossmann  therefore takes up for this group - as a subgenus of Daphnella - the name Rimosodaphnella

Species
Species within the genus Rimosodaphnella include:
 Rimosodaphnella angulata (Habe & Masuda, 1990)
 Rimosodaphnella brunneolineata Bonfitto & Morassi, 2013
 Rimosodaphnella deroyae McLean & Poorman, 1971
 Rimosodaphnella guaradara Criscione, Hallan, Puillandre & Fedosov, 2021
 Rimosodaphnella morra (Dall, 1881)
 Rimosodaphnella semicolon (Wood, 1842)
 Rimosodaphnella solomonensis Bonfitto & Morassi, 2013
 Rimosodaphnella tenuipurpurata Bonfitto & Morassi, 2013
  † Rimosodaphnella textilis (Brocchi, 1814)
 Rimosodaphnella truvana Criscione, Hallan, Puillandre & Fedosov, 2021
Species brought into synonymy
 Rimosodaphnella sculpta (Hinds, 1843): synonym of Veprecula sculpta (Hinds, 1843)

References

External links
 Cossmann M. (1916). Essais de paléoconchologie comparée. Dixième livraison. Paris, published by the author. 292 pp., 12 pls. 
  Bonfitto A. & Morassi M. (2013) New Indo-Pacific species of Rimosodaphnella Cossmann, 1916 (Gastropoda: Conoidea): a genus of probable Tethyan origin. Molluscan Research
 Criscione, F., Hallan, A., Puillandre, N. & Fedosov, A. (2021). Snails in depth: integrative taxonomy of Famelica, Glaciotomella and Rimosodaphnella (Conoidea: Raphitomidae) from the deep sea of temperate Australia. Invertebrate Systematics. 35: 940-962
 Bouchet, P.; Kantor, Y. I.; Sysoev, A.; Puillandre, N. (2011). A new operational classification of the Conoidea (Gastropoda). Journal of Molluscan Studies. 77(3): 273-308
 
 Worldwide Mollusc Species Data Base: Raphitomidae

 
Raphitomidae